Mervyn Etienne is an English karateka.  He is the winner of multiple European Karate Championships and World Karate Championships medals. Since retiring from karate competitions Etienne has become a "cognitive performance coach", physical therapist and co-founder of Bio-Performance Sciences Ltd.

References

External links
 Official website

Year of birth missing (living people)
Living people
Black British sportspeople
Karate coaches
English male karateka
Psycholinguists
Alumni of Birkbeck, University of London
World Games bronze medalists
Competitors at the 1985 World Games